Paden is a surname. Notable people with the surname include:

 Clifton Paden ("John Emerson"), American silent filmmaker, 1874–1956
 Khalil Paden, American football player
 Cline Paden, American evangelist and missionary, (1919–2007)
 Jurica Pađen, Croatian musician
 Frank Paden and Johnny Paden (of The Marvelows)